Dear Mandela is a 2012 South-African/American documentary focusing on three friends who are members of shackdwellers movement Abahlali baseMjondolo. They fight eviction by making a legal challenge against the KwaZulu-Natal Elimination and Prevention of Re-emergence of Slums Act of 2007 which ends up going to the final court of appeal, the Constitutional Court. The challenge is successful but also results in a violent attack on the Kennedy Road informal settlement in 2009. The film-makers were themselves caught up in the attack.

With the events of the film happening long after Nelson Mandela stepped down as President of South Africa, his promise to house all citizens is still a central question.

It was written, produced and directed by Dara Kell and Christopher Nizza. The film premiered at the 2012 Brooklyn International Film Festival.

Awards 
 Winner -  Grand Chameleon Award (Best Film) and Best Documentary, Brooklyn Film Festival.
 Winner - Best South African Documentary, Durban International Film Festival.
 Nominated - Africa Movie Academy Award for Best Documentary at the 8th Africa Movie Academy Awards.

References

External links 
 Dear Mandela at the Internet Movie Database
 Dear Mandela on Rotten Tomatoes 
 

South African documentary films
Documentary films about Nelson Mandela
2012 films
2012 documentary films
Squatting in South Africa
Squatting in film